Thomas Ray Connell (December 1, 1916 – November 14, 1986) was a politician in Ontario, Canada. He was a Progressive Conservative member of the Legislative Assembly of Ontario from 1951 to 1971. He represented the ridings of Hamilton—Wentworth and Wentworth North. He was a member of cabinet in the governments of Leslie Frost and John Robarts.

Background
A farmer, Connell married Irene Brenn in 1942. They raised two children, Allan and Brenda.

Politics
First elected in the general election in 1951, Connell was re-elected in the general elections in 1955, 1959, 1963, and 1967. During his first term in office, he served on variety of Standing Committees.

On November 1, 1956, he was appointed to Leslie Frost's cabinet as a Minister without Portfolio and, on April 28, 1958, he was appointed as the Minister of Reform Institutions. On December 22, 1958, he was promoted to a senior Cabinet post, as Minister of Public Works, which he would go on to hold for a remarkable eleven years. On June 5, 1969, having already indicated that he would not be running in the next general election, Connell was dropped from Cabinet and he retired in 1971.

Later life
After retiring from politics, Connell became involved with the horse racing industry. He set about to develop a horse racing facility in the Flamborough area, north of Hamilton, Ontario. He secured three large investors and, in 1972, work began on the construction of what came to be known as Flamboro Downs racetrack. Connell served as President of the company until the mid-1980s.

He died November 14, 1986 in Hamilton.

References

External links 
 

1916 births
1986 deaths
Members of the Executive Council of Ontario
Politicians from Hamilton, Ontario
Progressive Conservative Party of Ontario MPPs